The McDonough County Courthouse is located in the McDonough County city of Macomb, in the U.S. state of Illinois. The courthouse was constructed in 1871. Architect Elijah E. Myers designed the building in the Second Empire style; the courthouse is one of the few remaining Second Empire buildings in the United States.

The courthouse was added to the National Register of Historic Places in 1972. In the late 1970s, the county rehabilitated the building to restore its original exterior.

The building houses the County Clerk, Treasurer and State's Attorney's Office among others.

Notes

Buildings and structures in McDonough County, Illinois
Macomb, Illinois
County courthouses in Illinois
Clock towers in Illinois
Courthouses on the National Register of Historic Places in Illinois
Government buildings completed in 1869
Second Empire architecture in Illinois
National Register of Historic Places in McDonough County, Illinois
1869 establishments in Illinois